The Garden of Allah is a 1927 American silent romantic drama film directed by Rex Ingram, his final film for Metro-Goldwyn-Mayer. The film stars Ingram’s wife, actress Alice Terry and Iván Petrovich. It is the second version of the Robert Hichens 1904 British novel of the same name, which had been filmed by the Selig Polyscope Company in 1916 with Helen Ware and would be filmed again in 1936 with Marlene Dietrich and Charles Boyer.

An incomplete print of The Garden of Allah still exists and is preserved at the Metro-Goldwyn-Mayer/United Artists film archive.

Plot
Father Adrien (Iván Petrovich), a monk at the Trappist monastery of Notre Dame d'Afrique in Algeria, abandons his vows and escapes to the desert, where he meets and rescues Domini (Alice Terry).

Cast
 Alice Terry as Domini Enfilden
 Iván Petrovich as Father Adrien
 Marcel Vibert as Count Anteoni
 H.H. Wright as Lord Rens
 Pâquerette as Suzanne (Credited as Madame Paquerette)
Gerald Fielding as Batouch
Armand Dutertre as The Priest of Beni-Mora
 Ben Sadour as The Sand Diviner
 Claude Fielding as Hadj
 Rehba Bent Salah as Ayesha
 Michael Powell as A Tourist

Production
The film was shot at a studio in Nice, France, and the desert exteriors were filmed in Biskra, Algeria and Morocco.

References

External links
 
 
 
 

1927 films
1927 romantic drama films
American romantic drama films
American black-and-white films
Remakes of American films
American silent feature films
Films based on British novels
Films directed by Rex Ingram
Films set in Algeria
Films shot in Algeria
Films shot in Nice
Films shot in Morocco
Metro-Goldwyn-Mayer films
1920s American films
Silent romantic drama films
Silent American drama films